NGC 69 is a barred lenticular galaxy located in the constellation Andromeda. It is a member of the NGC 68 group. It was discovered in 1855 by R. J. Mitchell, who described it as "extremely faint, very small, round."

References

External links
 

0069
01191
18551007
+05-01-066
Andromeda (constellation)
Barred lenticular galaxies